was a retainer of Ikeda Katsumasa, head of the powerful "Setssu-Ikeda clan" of Settsu Province. Under Katsumasa, Murashige sided with Oda Nobunaga following Nobunaga's successful campaign to establish power in Kyoto.

Military life
Murashige became a retainer of Oda Nobunaga and  become daimyō (feudal lord) of Ibaraki Castle in 1573 and gained further notoriety through military exploits across Japan.

In 1571, Murashige and Nakagawa Kiyohide killed Wada Koremasa a senior retainer of Ashikaga Shogunate at Battle of Shiraigawara.

In 1574, Murashige along with Hashiba Hideyoshi capture Arioka Castle (Itami castle) from Itami Chikaoki and Nobunaga given Itami castle to Murashige.

In 1576, he commanded part of Nobunaga's army in the ten-year siege of the Ishiyama Honganji. But in
1578, during the Siege of Miki he was accused of sympathies to the Mōri clan, one of Nobunaga's enemies. Murashige retreated to Itami Castle (Hyōgo Prefecture) and held out there against a one-year siege by the forces of Oda before the castle fell in 1579. 

Araki escaped from the Siege of Itami (1579) and lived the rest of his life as a chanoyu disciple of Sen no Rikyū. He also served as a teaist and took the tea name of Dōkun 道薫. 
Rikyū shared some of his most detailed teachings with Murashige, one example being the well-known ‘Araki Settsu Kami-ate Densho’ (荒木摂津守宛伝書) manuscript. In the ‘Teaist Genealogy of All Generations Past and Present’ (Kokin Chajin Keifu 古今茶人系譜), Murashige is included as one of Rikyū’s Seven Sages.

Tale
There is a semi-legendary tale told about Araki's creative use of a tessen, or iron fan, in saving his own life. After being accused of treason by Akechi Mitsuhide, Araki was called before his lord, Oda Nobunaga. As was customary, he bowed low over the threshold before entering the room. But he sensed somehow Nobunaga's plan to have his guards slam the fusuma sliding doors on him, breaking his neck. Araki placed his fan in the doors' groove, preventing the doors from closing. Nobunaga's plan revealed, Araki's life was spared, with much reconciliation.

His son, raised under his mother's name, was the artist Iwasa Matabei.

References

Ratti, Oscar and Adele Westbrook (1973). Secrets of the Samurai. Edison, NJ: Castle Books.

Samurai
Japanese tea masters
16th-century Japanese people
Year of birth unknown
Year of death unknown
People from Ibaraki, Osaka
People from Itami, Hyōgo